Eupithecia atromaculata is a moth in the  family Geometridae. It is found in Peru.

References

Moths described in 1907
atromaculata
Moths of South America